The 1970 CFL Draft took place on Wednesday, February 11, 1970.  Seventy-six players were selected from among 243 eligible players from Canadian universities and colleges.  Canadian-born players who played at American colleges, such as Jim Corrigall of Kent State and Zenon Andrusyshyn of UCLA, were subject to the CFL's territorial rights rules and were ineligible for the College Draft.

The respective General Managers made the selections for all teams except the Toronto Argonauts, for whom Head Coach Leo Cahill made the picks.  Cahill stumbled in Round Five, attempting to select end Carl Lindros from the University of Western Ontario with the 43rd over-all selection.  However, Lindros already had been claimed earlier in this Draft, by Edmonton in Round Four, 30th over-all.  This was perhaps the first brush with sporting controversy for Lindros, who later would serve as the agent for his son, hockey player Eric.

First-year Ottawa GM Frank Clair added some levity in Round Eight, asking if Ron Clarke had been chosen yet.  CFL Chairman Greg Fulton responded, "As a matter of fact, yes.  You took him on the previous round."

Round one

Round two

Round three

Round four

Round five

Round six

Round seven

Round eight

Round nine

Round ten

Notes

Canadian College Draft
Cfl Draft, 1970